Masonic abbreviations of technical terms or of official titles are very extensively used in Freemasonry. They serve to abbreviate long or commonly-referenced titles in the fraternity.

These abbreviations were rarely employed in the earlier Masonic publications. There are no abbreviations, for example, found in Anderson's Constitutions. These came into use particularly by French authors during the 19th century.

Typography
In modern computer typography, the Therefore, sign is encoded in Unicode at U+2234 ∴ and in HTML (HTML &#8756; · &there4;). In many word processing programs therefore can be created by typing 2234 ALT+x, or ALT 8756. It is also possible to create the inverse, because, at U+2235 ∵ (HTML &#8757;), 2235 ALT+x, or ALT 8757.

The first use of "∴" to abbreviate a Masonic title was August 12, 1774, by the Grand Orient of France, in an address to its subordinates. No authoritative explanation of the meaning of these dots has been given, but According to Mackey it is supposed to refer to the three lights around the altar, or perhaps more generally to the number 3, and to the triangle, all important symbols in the Masonic system.

The doubling of a letter is intended to express the plural of that word of which the single letter is the abbreviation. For example, in French, F∴ signifies "Frère," or " Brother," and FF∴ " Frères," or "Brothers." Similarly in English, L∴ is sometimes used to denote "Lodge", and LL∴ to denote "Lodges". Exceptions exist regularly; for example, Sovereign Grand Inspectors General is abbreviated as S∴G∴I∴G∴, and not S∴G∴II∴G∴.

List
Some examples of Masonic abbreviations include:

A

 A.Dep. – Anno Depositionis. "In the Year of the Deposite", The date used by Royal and Select Masters
 A.&A. – Ancient and Accepted
 A.F.M. – Ancient Freemasons
 A.F.&A.M. – Ancient Free and Accepted Masons
 A.Inv. – Anno Inventionis. "In the Year of the Discovery", the date used by Royal Arch Masons
 A.L. – Anno Lucis, "In the Year of light" the date used by Ancient Craft Masons
 A∴ L∴ G∴ D∴ G∴ A∴ D∴ L'U∴ – À la Gloire du Grand Architecte de L'Univers. "To the Glory of the Grand Architect of the Universe" (French) The usual caption of French Masonic documents.
 A∴ L'O∴ – À L'Orient, "At the East" (French) The seat of the Lodge
 A.M. – Anno Mundi, "In The Year of the World". The date used in the Ancient and Accepted Scottish Rite
 A.O. – Anno Ordinis, "In the Year of the Order" . The date allegedly used by Knights Templars
 A.Y.M. – Ancient York Mason

B
 B∴ – Bruder. German, meaning Brother.
 BB∴ - Brothers (Plural)
 B∴ A∴ – Buisson Ardent. French, meaning Burning Bush.
 B.B. – Burning Bush.
 Bn∴ – Brudern. German, meaning Brethren.

C
 Comp∴ – Companion. Used by Brethren of the Royal Arch.
 C.C. – Celestial Canopy.
 C∴ H∴ – Captain of the Host.

D
 D∴ – Deputy.
 D. and A.F.– Due and Ancient Form.
 D∴ G∴ C∴ - District Grand Chapter
 D∴ D∴ G∴ H∴ P∴ – District Deputy Grand High Priest.
 D∴ D∴ G∴ M∴ – District Deputy Grand Master
 D∴ G∴ M∴ – Deputy Grand Master.
 D∴ G∴ B∴ A∴ W∴ – Der Grosse Baumeister aller Welten, "The Grand Architect of All Worlds" (German)
 D∴ G∴ G∴ H∴ P∴ – Deputy General Grand High Priest.
 D∴ G∴ H∴ P∴ – Deputy Grand High Priest.
 D∴ G∴ M∴ – Deputy Grand Master.
 D∴ M∴ J∴ – Deus Meumque Jus, "God and My Right" (Latin)
 D∴ Prov∴ G∴ M∴ – Deputy Provincial Grand Master.
 Deg. – Degree or Degrees. Another way is as in 33, meaning Thirty-Third Degree. (Although this is more commonly denoted with a degree sign)
 Dist. – District.

E
 E∴ – Eminent; Excellent; also East.
 E∴A∴ – Entered Apprentice. Sometimes abbreviated E∴ A∴ P∴ 
 E∴ C∴ – Excellent Companion.
 Ec∴ – Écossais, "Scottish", or belonging to the Scottish Rite (French)
 E∴ G∴ C∴ – Eminent Grand Commander.
 E∴ G∴ M∴ – Early Grand Master. 
 E∴ O∴ L∴ – Ex Oriente Lux, "Out of the East comes Light" (Latin).

F
 F∴ – Frère, "Brother" (French)
 F.&A.M. – Free and Accepted Masons.
 F∴C∴ – Fellowcraft.
 F∴M∴ – Freemason or Freemasonry.

G

 G. – Grand; sometimes read as Great. It also alludes to God, geometry or the Great Architect of the Universe.
 G.A.O.T.U. – Grand Architect of the Universe.
 G∴ A∴ S∴ – Grand Annual Sojourn.
 G.C.– Grand Chapter; Grand Council; Grand Cross; Grand Commander; Grand Chaplain; Grand Conclave; Grand Conductor; Grand Chancellor.
 G∴ C∴ G∴ – Grand Captain General; Grand Captain of the Guard.
 G ∴ C∴ H∴ – Grand Captain of the Host; Grand Chapter of Heredom.
 G∴ Com∴ – Grand Commandery; Grand Commander.
 G∴ D∴ – Grand Deacon.
 G∴ D∴ C∴ – Grand Director of Ceremonies.
 G∴ E∴ – Grand Encampment; Grand Bast; Grand Ezra.
 G∴ J∴ W∴ – Grand Junior Warden.
 G∴ G∴ C∴ – General Grand Chapter
 G∴ G∴ H∴ P∴ – General Grand High Priest.
 G∴ G∴ K∴ – General Grand King.
 G∴ G∴ M∴ F∴ V∴ – General Grand Master of the First Veil.
 G∴ G∴ S∴ – General Grand Scribe.
 G∴ G∴ T∴ – General Grand Treasurer.
 G∴ H∴ P∴ – Grand High Priest.
 G∴ K∴ – Grand King.
 G∴ L∴ – Grand Lodge. Grande Loge (French). Grosse Loge (German).
 G∴ M∴ – Grand Master; Grand Marshal; Grand Monarch.
 G∴ N∴ – Grand Nehemiah.
 G∴ O∴ – Grand Orient; Grand Organist.
 G∴ P∴ – Grand Pursuivant; Grand Prior; Grand Prelate; Grand Preceptor; Grand Preceptory; Grand Patron; Grand Priory; Grand Patriarch; Grand Principal.
 G∴ P∴ S∴ – Grand Principal Sojourner
 G∴ R∴ – Grand Registrar; Grand Recorder.
 G∴ R∴ A∴ C∴ – Grand Royal Arch Chapter.
 G∴ S∴ – Grand Scribe; Grand Secretary; Grand Steward.
 G∴ S∴ B∴ – Grand Sword Bearer; Grand Sword Bearer.
 G∴ S∴ E∴ – Grand Scribe Ezra.
 G∴ S∴ N∴ – Grand Scribe Nehemiah.
 G∴ S∴ W∴ – Grand Senior Warden.
 G∴ T∴ – Grand Treasurer; Grand Tyler.

H
 H∴ A∴ B∴ - Hiram Abif.
 H∴ E∴ – Holy Empire.
 H∴ J∴ – Heilige Johannes, "Holy Saints John" (German - referring jointly to John the Baptist and John the Evangelist)
 H∴ K∴ T∴ – Hiram, King of Tyre.
 H∴ R∴ D∴ M∴ – Heredom.

I
 Ill∴ – Illustrious.
 I∴ N∴ R∴ I∴ – . Latin, meaning "Jesus of Nazareth, King of the Jews". The Letters are also the initials of a significant sentence in Latin, namely, meaning "By fire nature is perfectly renewed".
 I∴ P∴ M∴ – Immediate Past Master. English title of an official last promoted from the chair.
 I∴ T∴ N∴ O∴ T∴ G∴ A∴ O∴ T∴ U∴ – In the Name of the Grand Architect of the Universe. Often forming the caption of Masonic documents.

J
 J∴ W∴ – Junior Warden.

K
 K∴ – King.
 K∴ E∴ P∴ – Knight of the Eagle and Pelican
 K∴ H∴ – Kadash, Knight of Kadosh.
 K∴ H∴ S∴ – Knight of the Holy Sepulcher
 K∴ M∴ – Knight of Malta
 K∴ S∴ – King Salomon (Suleiman)
 K∴ T∴ – Knights Templar; Knight Templar.

L
 L∴ – Lodge. Also Lehrling meaning "Apprentice" (German).
 L∴ R∴ – Lonon Rank. A distinction introduced in England in 1908.
 L∴ V∴ X∴ – Lux. Latin, meaning Light.

M
 M∴ – Mason; Masonry; Marshal; Mark; Minister; Master. Meister, in German. Maître, in French.
 M∴ C∴ – Middle Chamber.
 M∴ E∴ – Most Eminent; Most Excellent.
 M∴ E∴ G∴ H∴ P∴ – Most Excellent Grand High Priest.
 M∴ E∴ G∴ M∴ – Most Eminent Grand Master (of Knights Templar).
 M∴ E∴ M∴ – Most Excellent Master.
 M∴ E∴ Z∴ – Most Excellent Zerubbabel.
 M∴ K∴ G∴ – Maurer Kunst Geselle. German, meaning Fellow Craft.
 M∴ L∴ – Maurer Lehrling. German, meaning Entered Apprentice.
 M∴ L∴ – Mère Loge. French, meaning Mother Lodge.
 M∴ M∴ – Master Mason. Mois Maçonnique, "Masonic Month" (French): March 18 the first Masonic month among French Freemasons. Also Meister Maurer, "Master Mason" (German)
 M∴ P∴ S∴ – Most Puissant Sovereign.
 M∴ W∴ – Most Worshipful.
 M∴ W∴ G∴ M∴ – Most Worshipful Grand Master; Most Worthy Grand Matron.
 M∴ W∴ G∴ P∴ – Most Worthy Grand Patron.
 M∴ W∴ M∴ – Most Wise Master
 M∴ W∴ S∴ – Most Wise Sovereign

N
 N∴ E∴ C∴ – North-east Corner.
 N'o∴ P∴ V∴ D∴ M∴ – N'oubliez pas vos décorations Maçonniques, "Do not forget your Masonic regalia" (French), a phrase used in France on the corner of a summons.

O
 O∴ – Orient.
 O∴ A∴ C∴ – Ordo ab Chao, "Order Out of Chaos" (Latin)
 OB∴ – Obligation.

P
 P∴ – Past; Prelate; Prefect; Prior.
 P∴ C∴ W∴ – Principal Conductor of the Work.
 P∴ G∴ M∴ – Past Grand Master; Past Grand Matron.
 P∴ J∴ – Prince of Jerusalem.
 P∴ K∴ – Past King.
 P∴ M∴ – Past Master.
 PPLM - Prepaid (or Paid) Perpetual Life Membership
 P∴ S∴ – Principal Sojourner.
 Pro∴ G∴ M∴ – Pro-Grand Master.
 Prov∴ – Provincial.
 Prov∴ G∴ M∴ – Provincial Grand Master.

R
 R∴ A∴ – Royal Arch; Royal Art.
 R∴ A∴ C∴ – Royal Arch Captain; Royal Arch Chapter.
 R∴ A∴ M∴ – Royal Arch Mason; Royal Arch Masonry; Royal Ark Mariner. R∴ C∴  or R∴ t∴  Rose Croix. Appended to the signature of one having that degree
 R∴ E∴ – Right Eminent.
 R∴ E∴ A∴ et A∴ – Rite Écossais Ancien et Accepté, "Ancient and Accepted Scottish Rite" (French).
 R∴ L∴  or R∴ []∴ – Respectable Loge, "Worshipful Lodge" (French)
 R∴ S∴ Y∴ C∴ S∴ – Rosy Cross (in the Royal order of Scotland).
 R∴ W∴ – Right Worshipful.
 R∴ W∴ M∴ – Right Worshipful Master.

S
 S∴ – Scribe, Sentinel, Seneschal, Sponsor.
 S∴ C∴ – Supreme Council.
 S∴ G∴ D∴ – Senior Grand Deacon.
 S∴ G∴ I∴ G∴ – Sovereign Grand Inspector General
 S∴ G∴ W∴ – Senior Grand Warden.
 S∴ M∴ – Secret Master; Substitute Master
 S∴ O∴ – Senior Overseer.
 S∴ P∴ R∴ S∴ – Sublime Prince of the Royal Secret.
 S∴ S∴ – Sanctum Sanctorum, "Holy of Holies" (Latin)
 S∴ S∴ M∴ – Senior Substitute Magus.
 S∴ S∴ S∴ – The initials of the Latin word Salutem, meaning Greeting, repeated thrice and also found similarly in the French, Trois Fois Salut, meaning "Thrice Greeting". A common caption to French Masonic circulars or letters
 S∴ W∴ – Senior Warden.
 Sec∴ – Secretary.
 Soc∴ Ros∴ – Societas Rosicruciana
 Sur∴ – Surveillant. French, meaning Warden.

T
 T∴ C∴ F∴ – Très Cher Frère. French, meaning Very Dear Brother.
 T∴ G∴ A∴ O∴ T∴ U∴ – The Grand Architect of the Universe.
 T∴ S∴ – Tres Sage. Meaning Very Wise, addressed to the presiding officer of French Rite.

U
 U∴ D∴ – Under Dispensation.

V
 V∴ or Vén∴ – Vénérable. French, meaning Worshipful.
 V∴ D∴ B∴ – Very Dear Brother.
 V∴ D∴ S∴ A∴ – Veut Dieu Saint Amour, or Vult Dei Sanctus Animus. A formula used by Knights Templar. The expression Veut Dieu Saint Amour means "Wishes God Holy Love". Vult Dei Sanctus Animus is the Latin Version of the same phrase. 
 V∴ E∴ – Viceroy Eusebius; Very Eminent.
 V∴ F∴ – Vénérable Frère, "Worshipful Brother" (French)
 V∴ L∴ – Vraie Lumière, "True Light" (French)
 V∴ S∴ L∴ – Volume of the sacred Law.
 V∴ W∴ – Very Worshipful

W
 W∴ – Worshipful
 W∴ M∴ – Worshipful Master or Wurdiger Meister (German)

References 

Freemasonry
Masonic